The men's madison competition at the 2020 UEC European Track Championships was held on 15 November 2020.

Results
200 laps (50 km) with 20 sprints were raced.

References

Men's madison
European Track Championships – Men's madison